Roland Georges Baudric (25 January 1925 – 21 November 2012) was a French wrestler. He competed in the men's freestyle flyweight at the 1948 Summer Olympics.

References

External links
 

1925 births
2012 deaths
French male sport wrestlers
Olympic wrestlers of France
Wrestlers at the 1948 Summer Olympics